This is a list of Communist Party MPs.  It includes all Members of Parliament elected to the British House of Commons representing the Communist Party of Great Britain from 1834 onwards.  Members of the Scottish Parliament, the Welsh Assembly or the European Parliament are not listed.

Communist Party of Great Britain
Lists of United Kingdom MPs by party